Although bananas have been planted for thousands of years, the development of an intercontinental trade in bananas had to wait for the convergence of three things: modern rapid shipping (steamships), refrigeration, and railroads.  These three factors converged in the Caribbean in the 1870s, and would lead to the development of large-scale banana plantations, usually owned and operated by highly integrated large corporations such as Dole and Chiquita Brands International.

Origins
The first step in the link can be said to have taken place when United States based business men began work on railroads that would allow the Isthmus of Panama to be traversed.  Minor C. Keith won the right to build a trans-Isthmus railroad through Costa Rica in 1871.

In 1876, a New York-based sea captain named Lorenzo Dow Baker returned from a voyage to the Orinoco River, and stopping in Jamaica bought 160 stems of bananas in the hopes that he could recoup losses from his voyage by selling them in Philadelphia.  His gambit was successful, and he quickly began shipping from Jamaica to North America.  He then joined with Boston-based Andrew Preston to form the  Boston Fruit Company, the first company to engage in all aspects of the banana industry.  Boston Fruit eventually merged with other firms to form the United Fruit Company that would eventually become today's Chiquita Brands International. The secret to the Boston Fruit Company's success was the use of early forms of refrigeration to keep the bananas from becoming overripe in the voyage from the Caribbean.

The combination of land concessions to the infrastructure builders, usually subsidiaries of the shipping companies turned fruit producers, and the monopoly over railroad infrastructure and shipping allowed the United Fruit Company and Standard Fruit to achieve nearly complete control over the economies of the countries in which they operated.  Since banana exports came to dominate the overseas trade and most of the foreign exchange earnings of Central American countries, and the companies could use their financial clout as well as carefully established connections with local elites, they had great influence over politics in those areas, leading O. Henry, who lived in Honduras (which he called "Anchuria") in 1896–97 to coin the term banana republic for them.  Company influence was buttressed both by their willingness to hire mercenaries  as paramilitary forces and to involve the United States government in military interventions when they felt their interests were threatened.

Impact of company dominance

Although banana production for export had begun in much of mainland Central America in the 1880s, its initial impetus was from local small or medium-sized holdings.  As infrastructure companies gained control of land around their railroads, however, they used their capacity to create much larger holdings and their control of trade to force the smaller competitors out.  In addition they brought in thousands of new workers to labor on these large estates, many from the Pacific side of the country, many others from the English-speaking Caribbean.  Company policies often favored the English speakers for higher level jobs, thus the most important positions were held by U. S.-born European-Americans, though African-descended Caribbean people were also favored in lesser but still skilled work.

Although the companies claimed to pay better wages than prevailed in the local economies, their wage scale for rural workers was low, and company polities favored low wages and kept them low.  As some compensation, company employees did have access to schools, hospitals and housing from the company.  This housing was usually segregated. "White Zones" were reserved for the company elite, and included better houses, recreational facilities, and schools; other employees lived outside this zone.  Racial discrimination policies that were widespread in the United States at the time were transported to Central America.

The companies never used as much land as they acquired.  They learned early that the plants were vulnerable to hurricanes, and to Panama disease, which first appeared in the 1910s in Panama, and completely destroyed banana growth very rapidly in areas where it had taken hold.  As a result, they both acquired far more land than they needed to support banana cultivation, and they left these lands vacant as a reserve.  Such policies in countries like Guatemala where landlessness was prevalent led to anti-company dissent and inhibited land reform efforts.  During the Cold War, companies labeled land reform efforts as Communist and again were able to call on the U. S. to send military assistance to keep them down.

History
By the 1960s, the spread of Panama disease forced exporters of Gros Michel bananas (a susceptible cultivar) to switch to growing resistant cultivars belonging to the Cavendish subgroup (another Musa acuminata AAA).

Marketing and labeling efforts in the late 1990s established a market for Fair trade bananas. The various organizations and companies involved focus on increasing the price paid to small banana growers and the wages of agricultural workers.

See also
 Banana industry
 Banana production in the Caribbean
 Banana production in the United States
 Corporación Bananera Nacional
 History of peasant banana production in the Americas

References

Banana production
History of agriculture
History of agriculture in the United States